The Federal Customs Service of Russia (Federalnaya tamozhennaya sluzhba Rossiskoy Federatsii; abbreviated , FTS Rossii) is a Russian government service regulating customs. It is part of Russia's Ministry of Finance.

History
The Customs Services in Russia were formed in 1865, as The Customs Department of the Ministry of Finance.

In 1917 the Soviet Customs Service was operated as The Main Directorate for Customs Control as part of the MKTP - The People's Commissariat for Trade and Industry.

In 1991, The Soviet Customs was replaced with The State Customs Committee (GTK) under the Ministry for Economic Development and in 2006 the GTK was renamed to current name.

On January 15, 2016, a presidential ukase placed the Federal Customs Service under the control of the Ministry of Finance.

Heads of Customs of Russia

State Customs Committee 
 Mikhail Vanin (1999 - 2004)

Federal Customs Service 
 Aleksander Zherikhov (2004 - 2006)
 Andrey Belyaninov (2006 - 2016)
 Vladimir Bulavin (since 2016)

See also

 Awards of the Federal Customs Service of Russia
 Federal crime
 U.S. Immigration and Customs Enforcement
 Federal Security Service of the Russian Federation
 Main Directorate for Migration Affairs of the Ministry of Internal Affairs

References

External links

International agencies comparable to FTS
 U.S. Immigration and Customs Enforcement
 Canada Border Services Agency
 Serious Organized Crime Agency—UK
 RCMP Integrated Border Enforcement Teams—Canada
 SVA Customs Surveillance Service—Spain
 Bundesgrenzschutz
 Guardia di Finanza-Italy

Federal law enforcement agencies of Russia
Government agencies established in 1865
1865 establishments in the Russian Empire
Organizations based in Moscow
Foreign trade of Russia
Customs services